Clive Arden was the pen name of the English author, Lily Clive Nutt 1888 - after 1950. Arden lived in Trethevy, near Tintagel, Cornwall.

Bibliography 
Arden wrote romantic fiction and her works include:
 Sinners in Heaven (1923) 
 Enticement (1924) 
 Four Complete Novels (1931)
 The Fetters Of Eve (1934) 
 The Enchanted Spring (1935) 
 The Veil of Glamour (1935)
 The Spider and the Fly (1935)
 The Eagle's Wing (1938)
 Anthony Keeps Tryst (1940)

Adaptations and legacy 
Both Sinners in Heaven and Enticement were turned into silent movies by Paramount. Sinners in Heaven was directed by Alan Crosland in 1924 and starred Bebe Daniels and Richard Dix. Enticement was directed by George Archainbaud in 1925 and starred Mary Astor and Clive Brook.

References

1888 births
English romantic fiction writers
Year of death missing